"Every 1's a Winner"  is the third single from the 1978 Hot Chocolate album of the same name. The single was released on 4 March 1978 on RAK Records in the UK and Infinity Records in the US. It peaked at #12 on the UK Singles Chart and #6 on the US Billboard Hot 100; it was the band's second-highest charting single in the US, behind "You Sexy Thing".

Track listing
All tracks written by Errol Brown; except where indicated.

1978 release
7" vinyl
"Every 1's a Winner" – 3:35
"Power Of Love" (Harvey Hinsley, Patrick Olive, Tony Connor) – 3:19

12" vinyl (Infinity Records, US)
"Every 1's a Winner" – 7:17
"Put Your Love In Me" – 5:48

1988 remix
7" single
"Every 1's A Winner (Groove Mix)" – 3:54
"So You Win Again" (Russ Ballard) – 4:29

12" single 1
"Every 1's A Winner (Sexy Remix)" – 6:28
"Every 1's A Winner (Bonus Beats)" – 2:32
"Every 1's A Winner (7" Groove Mix)" – 3:53
"So You Win Again" (Russ Ballard) – 4:29

12" single 2
"Every 1's A Winner (Extended Groove Remix)" – 6:40
"Every 1's A Winner (Groove Mix Bonus Beats)" – 3:05
"Every 1's A Winner (7" Groove Mix)" – 3:53
"So You Win Again" (Russ Ballard) – 4:29

Chart history

Weekly charts

Year-end charts

Remixes, covers and sampling
Hot Chocolate released a remixed version of the song on their 1987 album 2001; the remix reached #67 in the UK. A 1999 version of the song by Electrotheque reached #85 in the UK.

The rap group Insane Clown Posse sampled "Every 1's a Winner" on their song "The Mighty Death Pop!".

References

Hot Chocolate (band) songs
1978 singles
1978 songs
RAK Records singles
Big Tree Records singles
Song recordings produced by Mickie Most
Songs written by Errol Brown